Michelle Watson  (born 17 June 1976) is an Australian former footballer who played as a forward for the Australia women's national soccer team. She was part of the team at the 1994 OFC Women's Championship and 1995 FIFA Women's World Cup. At the club level, she played for Marconi Stallions in Australia.

References

External links 
 

1976 births
Living people
Australian women's soccer players
Australia women's international soccer players
Place of birth missing (living people)
1995 FIFA Women's World Cup players
Women's association football forwards